Tuqtu Q'asa (Quechua tuqtu broody hen, q'asa mountain pass, "hen's pass", also spelled Tojto Khasa) is a mountain in the Bolivian Andes which reaches a height of approximately . It is located in the Chuquisaca Department, Oropeza Province, Poroma Municipality. Tuqtu Q'asa lies southeast of Markawi.

References 

Mountains of Chuquisaca Department